Ted Griffin (18 March 1913 – 16 February 1998) was an  Australian rules footballer who played with Fitzroy in the Victorian Football League (VFL).

Notes

External links 

1913 births
1998 deaths
Australian rules footballers from Victoria (Australia)
Fitzroy Football Club players